Ivan Zlatev (born August 1, 1990) is a Bulgarian biathlete.  He competed at the 2014 Winter Olympics in Sochi, in sprint and individual.

External links
Ivan Zlatev at IBU

References

1990 births
Living people
Biathletes at the 2014 Winter Olympics
Bulgarian male biathletes
Olympic biathletes of Bulgaria
People from Bansko
Sportspeople from Blagoevgrad Province
20th-century Bulgarian people
21st-century Bulgarian people